Grand Prairie Township is one of the fifteen townships of Marion County, Ohio, United States.  The 2010 census found 1,590 people in the township.

Geography
Located in the northern part of the county, it borders the following townships:
Antrim Township, Wyandot County - north
Dallas Township, Crawford County - northeast
Scott Township - east
Claridon Township - southeast corner
Marion Township - south
Big Island Township - southwest corner
Salt Rock Township - west
Pitt Township, Wyandot County - northwest corner

No municipalities are located in Grand Prairie Township.

Name and history
It is the only Grand Prairie Township statewide.  The only settlement in Grand Prairie Township is that of the unincorporated community of Brush Ridge.

Government
The township is governed by a three-member board of trustees, who are elected in November of odd-numbered years to a four-year term beginning on the following January 1. Two are elected in the year after the presidential election and one is elected in the year before it. There is also an elected township fiscal officer, who serves a four-year term beginning on April 1 of the year after the election, which is held in November of the year before the presidential election. Vacancies in the fiscal officership or on the board of trustees are filled by the remaining trustees.

References

External links
County website

Townships in Marion County, Ohio
Townships in Ohio